Robin is a unisex given name and a surname. It was originally a diminutive masculine given name or nickname of Robert, derived from the prefix Ro-  (hrod, Old Germanic, meaning "fame" and berht, meaning "bright"), and the suffix -in (Old French diminutive). In Europe, although it is sometimes regarded as a feminine name, it is generally given to boys. In 2014, 88% of babies named Robin in England were boys. In United States, it used to be more popular as a feminine name—during the 1990s, for example, it was the 325th most popular name for girls and the 693rd most popular name for boys. However the gap has been narrowing and recently the number of baby boys and baby girls named Robin in United States has been roughly similar (as visualized in the adjacent chart). In 2014 46% of babies named Robin in United States were boys, which is about three times that figure in 1990.

There are several common variations, including Robyn, Robbin, Robine, Robyne, Robynne, and Robbyn. Robin has its origin in France and is also a very common surname in France. 
Robin is occasionally found as a surname in English-speaking countries. Common nicknames are Rob, Robbie or Bobby. Robin may refer to:

Given name
 Robin Aitken (born 1952), British journalist
 Robin Antin (born 1961), American-born music video director, best known for being the creator for the hip-hop/R&B group Pussycat Dolls
Robin Barnett (born 1958), British diplomat
 Robin Bell, American scientist
 Robin Bengtsson (born 1990), Swedish singer
 Robin Blaze (born 1971), English countertenor
 Robin Boyd (architect) (1919–1971), Australian architect
Robin Boyd (theologian) (1924–2018), Irish theologian and missionary
 Robin Brockway,  (born 1981) British actor
 Robin Brown (disambiguation}
 Pauline "Robin" Robinson Bush (1949–1953), daughter of George H. W. Bush
 Robin Bush (1943–2010), English historian
 Robin Buxton Potts, Canadian politician
 Robin Chase, co-founder and former CEO of Zipcar
 DJ Robin Clark, (born 1982), German hardstyle DJ and record producer
 Robin Cole (born 1955), American football player
 Robin Coleman (born 1973), American actress and strongwoman
 Robin G. Collingwood (1889–1943), English philosopher, historian and archaeologist
 Robin Cook (1946–2005), British Member of Parliament, used the name instead of his given name Robert
 Robin Cook (American novelist) (born 1940), American doctor and novelist
 Robin Cousins (born 1957), British Olympic gold medal figure skater
 Robin Curtis, (born 1956), American actress
 Sir Robin Day (1923–2000), British political commentator and journalist
 Robin Darwall-Smith, British archivist
 Robin Darwin (1910–1974), British artist
 Robin Dutt (born 1965), German football manager
 Robin Fernando (1937–2022), Sri Lankan actor
 Robin Finck (born 1971), guitarist for Nine Inch Nails and Guns N' Roses
 Robin Gibb (1949–2012), member of the pop group trio, the Bee Gees
 Robin Givens (born 1964), American actress
 Robin Goad (born 1970), American weightlifter
 Robin Gosens (born 1994), German footballer 
 Robin Hartshorne (born 1938), American mathematician
 Robin Herman (1951-2022), American sports journalist
 Robin Hobb (born 1952), American fantasy author
 Robin Hunter (1929–2004), British actor
 Robin Ince (born 1969), British comedian
 Robin Knox-Johnston (born 1939), British sailor
 Robin Korving (born 1974), Dutch hurdler
 Robin Laws (born 1964), Canadian violinist
 Robin Leach (1941–2018), host of Lifestyles of the Rich and Famous
 Robin Lodders (born 1994), German basketball player
 Robin Martin-Jenkins (born 1975), English cricketer
 Robin Meade (born 1969), lead news anchor for HLN's morning show Morning Express with Robin Meade
 Robin Miller (chef) (born 1966), an American chef, host of Quick Fix Meals with Robin Miller
 Robin Morgan (born 1941), American writer and women's rights activist 
 Robin Moulder (born 1966), bassist for the bands TCR and Jack Off Jill
 Robin Moore (1925–2008), American writer
 Robin Nedwell (1946–1999), English actor
 Robin Nievera (born 1986), Filipino singer-songwriter
 Robin Peace,  New Zealander social scientist
 Robin Pecknold (born 1986), American singer, songwriter and guitarist, lead vocalist for Fleet Foxes
 Robin Quivers (born 1952), American radio personality, co-host of The Howard Stern Show
 Robin Roberts (baseball) (1926–2010), American baseball player
 Robin Roberts (newscaster) (born 1960), American newscaster
 Robin S. (born 1962), American dance vocalist
 Robin Schulz (born 1987), German DJ, Record producer and remixer
 Robin Singh (disambiguation), various people
 Robin Smith (comics), British comic book artist
 Robin Smith (cricketer) (born 1963), South African-born English international
 Robin Smith (chess player) (1952–2009), American correspondence chess champion
 Robin Söderling (born 1984), Swedish tennis player
 Robin Stevens (puppeteer) (born 1960), English puppeteer, actor, television director, and writer
 Robin Tait (1940–1984), New Zealand discus thrower
 Robin Lord Taylor (born 1978), American actor
 Robin Tenney (born 1958), American tennis player
 Robin Thicke (born 1977), Canadian-American R&B singer-songwriter and musician
 Robin L. Titus (born 1954), Republican member of the Nevada Assembly
 Robin Trower (born 1945), guitarist for his own eponymous band and Procol Harum
 Robin Tunney (born 1972), Irish-American actress
 Robin Uthappa (born 1985), Indian cricketer
 Robin van Persie (born 1983), Dutch football player
 Robin Ventura (born 1967), American baseball player and manager
 Robin Waterfield (born 1952), British classical scholar
 Robin Williams, (1951–2014), Academy Award-winning American actor and comedian
 Robin Williamson, (born 1943), Scottish musician and founding member of The Incredible String Band
 Robin Windsor, (born 1979), professional dancer
 Robin Wright, (born 1966) American actress
 Robin Yalçın (born 1994), German footballer of Turkish descent
 Robin Yount (born 1955), baseball player
 Robin Zander (born 1953), lead singer and rhythm guitarist for the rock band Cheap Trick
 Robin (singer), (born 1998), full name Robin Packalen, Finnish singer
 Rockin' Robin (wrestler) (born Robin Smith, 1965), American WWF performer

Fictional characters
 Robin Hood, legendary English outlaw
 Robin (comics), Batman's sidekick from DC comics
 Robin Goodfellow, common pseudonym of Puck in folklore
 Robin the Frog, Muppet nephew of Kermit the Frog
 Robin Vote, main character in Djuna Barnes's novel Nightwood
 Robin Scherbatsky, in the American television show How I Met Your Mother
 Robin Scorpio-Drake, HIV positive doctor on the American television soap opera General Hospital
 Robin Sena, main character in the anime Witch Hunter Robin
 Robin Oakapple, main character in the opera Ruddigore by Gilbert & Sullivan
 Robin, from Mona the Vampire
 Robin Ellacott, one of the protagonists from the Cormoran Strike series of books
 Robin Branagh, a character from British children's TV series Young Dracula
 Robin, default name of main character from the video game Fire Emblem Awakening
 Robyn Miller, a character from British TV series Casualty
 Robin Griffin, main character from the series Top of the Lake, by Jane Campion
Robin, local carpenter and mother of Sebastian and Maru in the video game Stardew Valley
Robin Buckley, character from the Netflix original series Stranger Things who first appears in the third season
Robin, caveman character from the BBC TV series Ghosts
 Robin Newman, law student in the video game Phoenix Wright: Ace Attorney − Dual_Destinies
Robin Nico (Nico Robin), archaeologist of the Straw Hat Pirates in the manga series One Piece

Pseudonyms
 Robin, a pen-name of Sir Robert Walpole

Surname
 Charles Robin, businessman from the Isle of Jersey
 Charles-Philippe Robin (1821–1885), French anatomist and biologist
 Dany Robin (1927–1995), French actress
 Emily Robin (1874–1929), British bordello owner
 Gabriela Robin, singer and lyricist
Guillaume Robin, 15th-century French architect
James Robin (1817–1894), South Australian businessman
Jean Robin (writer) (born 1946), French writer specializing in occult
Jean-Cyril Robin (born 1969), French former professional road racing cyclist
 Leo Robin (1900–1984), American composer, lyricist and songwriter
 Mado Robin (1918–1960), French coloratura singer
 Marie-Monique Robin (born 1960), French journalist
 Marthe Robin (1902–1981), French Roman Catholic mystic
 Martial Robin (born 1977), French football player
 Michel Robin (1930–2020), French film, stage, and television actor
 Régine Robin (1939–2021), novelist, writer, translator and professor of sociology
 Ron Robin (born 1951), Israeli historian and President of the University of Haifa
 Teddy Robin (born 1945), Hong Kong English pop singer-songwriter, actor, and director
 Victor Gustave Robin (1855–1897), French mathematician

Fictional characters

 Christopher Robin, young boy in A. A. Milne's work, most notably his Winnie-the-Pooh books
 Fanny Robin, in Thomas Hardy's novel Far from the Madding Crowd
 Robin (Fire Emblem), the player character and a main protagonist in Fire Emblem Awakening

See also
 Robin (disambiguation)
Robyn (name)
Robbyn
 Robben
Robinson (name)
Robene and Makyne, genre names for characters in Scottish pastourelle

References

English-language masculine given names
English masculine given names
English feminine given names
English-language unisex given names
English unisex given names
German masculine given names
Given names derived from birds